La Résistance is a professional wrestling tag team and former stable who performed for World Wrestling Entertainment. The name of the team is a reference to the French Resistance.

History

World Wrestling Entertainment

Debut
The stable was created when WWE aired vignettes of two arrogant "Frenchmen" (Sylvain Grenier and René Duprée, who are both actually French-Canadians) attacking the United States and its policy from a French news studio.
Grenier and Duprée made their first appearance on the April 28, 2003 edition of Raw as La Résistance by attacking then-babyface, Scott Steiner. Steiner had made remarks two weeks earlier comparing France to hell and Grenier and Duprée were offended. La Résistance  went on to feud with Scott Steiner and Test who was forced to be Steiner's tag team partner by Stacy Keibler, La Résistance ended up defeating Steiner and Test at Judgment Day on May 18, 2003 in the team's pay-per-view debut. Their most notorious insult to the United States came on Memorial Day in 2003 when they interrupted Raw announcer Lilian Garcia as she was singing America the Beautiful. After several minutes of Grenier calling America barbarians and saying that France would not allow the US to be the police force of the world, the sound of glass shattering suddenly filled the arena when Steve Austin cleared the ring of La Résistance and said some unflattering remarks about the French nation.

On the May 26, 2003 edition of Raw, Grenier defeated Rob Van Dam in a Flag match to win a World Tag Team Championship shot.  Grenier and Duprée went on to win the World Tag Team Championship from Kane and Rob Van Dam at Bad Blood.

Addition of Robert Conway
In mid 2003 the decision was made to add a third member, Rob Conway, who posed as an American serviceman being abused by Grenier and Duprée. When The Dudley Boyz came out to attack La Résistance they brought Conway in the ring with an American flag. Once the Dudley Boyz had their backs turned to Conway, he attacked them with the American flag and then tore it off the pole and laid it on top of them.

La Resistance lost the titles at Unforgiven 2003 in a three on two handicapped tables match to the Dudley Boyz. The trio went on to feud with several other tag teams, including Hurricane and Rosey, and the team of Garrison Cade and Mark Jindrak before Grenier suffered a back injury in October 2003. Duprée and Conway would hold the team together until Grenier's return on the March 15, 2004 edition of Raw, but the stable was broken up the very next week when Duprée was drafted in a lottery by WWE's other brand, SmackDown.

At WrestleMania XX, La Résistance competed in a Fatal 4-Way match for the World Tag Team Championship where Booker T and Rob Van Dam retained the titles.

Conway and Grenier
While Duprée went to SmackDown and established his French Phenom persona, Conway and Grenier were left to keep La Résistance together as a unit. (neither Duprée nor the La Résistance tag team changed their entrance music.) Conway began being billed as Robért Conway (pronounce Robe-air), and he and Grenier began being announced as hailing from Quebec City (later changed to simply the Province of Quebec) instead of France and wore new ring attire with the blue and white colours of Quebec along with the traditional fleur-de-lis. Several months after the loss of Duprée, La Résistance went on to defeat Edge and Chris Benoit for the World Tag Team Titles in Grenier's home town of Montreal, Quebec to a standing ovation.

With the help of Raw General manager Eric Bischoff, La Résistance managed to keep hold of the titles for five months, but at the first interactive PPV Taboo Tuesday they had to defend their titles against the two Superstars who were not voted for by the fans to get a World Heavyweight Championship shot at Triple H. This stipulation meant they would either face the team of Edge and Benoit, Edge and Shawn Michaels, or Benoit and Michaels.

During Taboo Tuesday, the announcement was made that Shawn Michaels had been voted for a title shot with 38.72% of the vote compared to Edge's 33.42% and Benoit's 27.86%; this meant La Résistance would meet Edge and Benoit in a rematch of their championship victory five months earlier. They would lose the titles to Edge and Benoit, even though Edge left the arena half-way through the match leaving Benoit to win the match on his own. As Grenier and Conway invoked their rematch clause thirteen days later on Raw, the dissension between Benoit and Edge would continue and finally be their undoing as La Résistance won the titles back. Soon after, on the November 15, 2004 edition of Raw, La Résistance lost the World Tag Team Championship again, this time to Eugene and William Regal.

Grenier and Conway managed to win the World Tag Team Championship for the third time together and fourth since the creation of the stable. This championship win was a rare one since it was won at a Raw-brand house show on January 16, 2005 in Winnipeg, Manitoba. This time, La Résistance defeated Regal and Jonathan Coachman, who was taking the place of the legitimately injured Eugene (who would miss several months due to a left patella tear at New Year's Revolution). Grenier and Conway soon lost the belts back to Regal and his tag team partner Tajiri, on an episode of Raw taking place from Tajiri's hometown of Tokyo, Japan.

La Résistance repeatedly attempted to regain the gold (mainly on Sunday Night Heat) from Regal and Tajiri in many different matches but just fell short during each one. During their "last shot" for the gold the team thought they had won back the titles only to have the decision reversed by referee Mike Chioda due to La Résistance's Grenier pinning Tajiri, not Regal, who was the legal man. La Résistance went on to lose the match.

On the March 14 episode of Raw, La Résistance were defeated by The Rockers (Shawn Michaels and Marty Jannetty) in a Rockers's Reunion. At WrestleMania 21, La Résistance competed in a 30-man Battle Royal which was won by Booker T.

While this was to be their last chance to win back the gold from Regal and Tajiri, the team were given one more chance during a Tag Team Turmoil match during Backlash. In the match, La Résistance managed to eliminate the champions but were still unable to win the match and regain the titles as they were defeated by the winners of the match, Rosey and The Hurricane. The next night on Raw, La Résistance tried again to win the titles in a match against the new champions but were unsuccessful again.  They would feud with Hurricane and Rosey, having various filler matches on multiple pay-per-view events.

Disbanding
Grenier and Conway went into singles competition with announcers claiming that the members of La Résistance were trying to "one up" each other in singles matches without the other man in their corner. This saw Conway defeat a jobber and Val Venis, while Grenier was defeated by both Val Venis and Chris Jericho before both men competed in a triple threat match (against Intercontinental Champion Shelton Benjamin for the title), Benjamin won the match, not long after the La Résistance members began to argue and fight. This altercation between the two led to a taped main event match on June 6, 2005, for the June 12 episode of Sunday Night Heat. This match saw Rob Conway portray the heel character, and defeat Sylvain Grenier.

On June 30, 2005, Grenier and Dupree were last minute trades in the 2005 WWE Draft, which saw Grenier leave Raw to go to SmackDown! and Dupree come back to Raw.

Reformations
On April 3, 2006 Rene Duprée and Rob Conway teamed together in a dark match before Raw, in a losing effort against The Highlanders

While in WWE Developmental Territory, Ohio Valley Wrestling, Conway and Grenier briefly reteamed as La Résistance in a match on November 15, 2006 to earn an OVW Southern Tag Team Championship match by defeating the reigning champions, Cody Runnels and Shawn Spears. However the team would not win the title match.

On February 20, 2007 as La Résistance Dupree and Grenier made their return as a tag team on the ECW brand defeating Los Luchas. but on March 1, 2007, Dupree was suspended due to a violation of the Health and Wellness policy. This left Grenier and Conway to team together again in OVW and dark matches for the next couple months until May 11, 2007 when Conway was released from WWE.

On July 26, 2007 Duprée was also released from his WWE contract. On August 13, 2007 Grenier was released from his WWE contract officially ending the WWE careers of all three La Résistance members.

Independent circuit (2008–2009, 2016–2017)
On August 30, 2008, Grenier and Conway, as La Résistance, defeated Jay Phenomenon and Karl Briscoe to win the NCW Tag Team Championships.

On March 21, 2009, Grenier and Conway as La Résistance defeated Les Titans (Bishop and Chakal) to become the new TOW Tag Team Champions. On September 25, 2009, they lost the titles when they were defeated by Al Snow and Pierre Carl Ouellet.

On November 5, 2016, Grenier and Duprée reunited to defeat Michael Von Payton and Platinum Preston Perry at Great North Wrestling: Star Stampede in Hawkesbury, ON.

On November 6, 2016, Duprée and Grenier were part of a four corners Tag Team match for the CRW Tag Team Championships against the champions TDT (Mathieu St-Jacques and Thomas Dubois) and two other teams 3.0 (Scott Parker and Shane Matthews) and The Holy Alliance (Genesis and Paul Rosetti), TDT went on to retain the titles.

On August 12, 2017, Grenier and Duprée defeated Kryss Thorn and Scotty O'Shea to win the Canadian Wrestling Federation Tag Team Championship.

Members

Championships and accomplishments
Canadian Wrestling Federation
CWF Tag Team Championship (1 time, current) – Duprée and Grenier
Fortitude Wrestling Entertainment
FWE Tag Team Championship (1 time, current) – Conway and Grenier
Northern Championship Wrestling
NCW Tag Team Championship (1 time) – Conway and Grenier
Top of the World Wrestling
TOW Tag Team Championship (1 time) – Conway and Grenier
World Wrestling Entertainment
World Tag Team Championship (4 times) – Duprée and Grenier (1) and Conway and Grenier (3)
Wrestling Observer Newsletter
Worst Tag Team (2003) – Duprée and Grenier

References

External links
Brawling for Baguettes: October 2003
Online World of Wrestling profile

ECW (WWE) teams and stables
WWE teams and stables
WWE World Tag Team Champions
Independent promotions teams and stables